Kochunny Thampuran (born 5 June 1937) was an Indian cricketer. He was a right-handed batsman and right-arm off-break bowler who played for Travancore-Cochin. He was born in Thrippunithura.

Thampuran made a single first-class appearance for the team, during the 1956-57 Ranji Trophy season, against Andhra. From the lower order, he scored 11 runs in the first innings in which he batted, and a single run in the second, as Travancore-Cochin lost the match by a heavy margin.

External links
Kochunny Thampuran at Cricket Archive

1937 births
Living people
Indian cricketers
Travancore-Cochin cricketers
Cricketers from Kochi